Unha or Uña is a locality and decentralized municipal entity located in the municipality of Naut Aran, in Province of Lleida province, Catalonia, Spain. As of 2020, it has a population of 136.

Geography 
Unha is located 171km north-northeast of Lleida.

References

Populated places in the Province of Lleida